Alban McCoy OFM Conv is a British Catholic writer and priest.

McCoy is the author of An Intelligent Person's Guide to Christian Ethics (2004) and An Intelligent Person's Guide to Catholicism (2005, new ed. 2008). Since 1995, he has been the Religious Books Editor of The Tablet, now Editorial Consultant. Until 2013, he was the Catholic chaplain to the University of Cambridge. He was Dean of St Edmund's College, Cambridge 2013-2018 Acting Dean 2018-2020, now Praelector of St Edmund's College, Cambridge and Visiting Professor at the Universidad Peruana (UPC) des Ciencias Aplicadas, Lima, Peru.

References

21st-century British Roman Catholic priests
Living people
Catholic Church in Cambridge
St Edmund's College, Cambridge
1951 births